Nam Joon-jae (born April 7, 1988) is a South Korean football player who plays for K League 2 side Jeju United FC

External links
 

1988 births
Living people
People from Gyeongju
Association football forwards
South Korean footballers
Incheon United FC players
Jeonnam Dragons players
Jeju United FC players
Seongnam FC players
Asan Mugunghwa FC players
Pohang Steelers players
K League 1 players
K League 2 players
Sportspeople from North Gyeongsang Province